Roseiflexus is a genus of bacteria in the family Roseiflexaceae with one known species (Roseiflexus castenholzii).

References

Further reading 
 
 
 
 

Bacteria genera
Monotypic bacteria genera